Patrick Ferguson (1744 – 7 October 1780) was a Scottish officer in the British Army, an early advocate of light infantry and the designer of the Ferguson rifle.  He is best known for his service in the 1780 military campaign of Charles Cornwallis during the American Revolutionary War in the Carolinas, in which he played a great effort in recruiting American Loyalists to serve in his militia against the Patriots.

Ultimately, his activities and military actions led to a Patriot militia force mustered to put an end to his force of Loyalists, and he was killed in the Battle of Kings Mountain, at the border between the colonies of North Carolina and South Carolina. Leading a group of Loyalists whom he had recruited, he was the only regular army officer participating on either side of the conflict.  The victorious Patriot forces desecrated his body in the aftermath of the battle.

Early life
Patrick Ferguson was born at Pitfour in Aberdeenshire, Scotland, on 25 May (Old Style)/4 June (New Style) 1744, the second son and fourth child of advocate James Ferguson of Pitfour (who was raised to the judges' bench as a Senator of the College of Justice, so known as Lord Pitfour after 1764) and his wife Anne Murray, a sister of the literary patron Patrick Murray, 5th Lord Elibank.

Through his parents, he knew a number of major figures in the Scottish Enlightenment, including philosopher and historian David Hume, on whose recommendation he read Samuel Richardson's novel Clarissa when he was fifteen, and the dramatist John Home.  He had numerous first cousins through his mother's family: these included Sir William Pulteney, 5th Baronet, Commodore George Johnstone, and Sir James Murray (later Murray-Pulteney).

In 1770 Ferguson purchased the Castara estate in Tobago. After Ferguson's death the estate was inherited by his younger brother George who had managed it since the early 1770s and developed it into a successful enterprise. Exports of rum, sugar, and molasses were made back to the UK from it.

Seven Years' War
Ferguson began his military career in his teens, encouraged by his maternal uncle James Murray. He served briefly in the Holy Roman Empire with the Scots Greys during the Seven Years' War, until a leg ailment – probably tuberculosis in the knee – forced him to return home. After recovering, now in peace-time, he served with his regiment on garrison duty. In 1768, he purchased a command of a company in 70th Regiment of Foot, under the Colonelcy of his cousin Alexander Johnstone, and served with them in the West Indies until his lame leg again began to trouble him.

After returning home in 1772, he took part in light infantry training, coming to the attention of General Howe. During this time, he developed the Ferguson rifle, a breech-loading flintlock weapon based on Chaumette's earlier system.

American War of Independence

1777
In 1777, Ferguson went to the colonies to serve in the American War of Independence; commanding an experimental rifle corps equipped with his new rifle. However, after initial success, he was shot through the right elbow joint at the Battle of Brandywine on 11 September 1777 in Pennsylvania. Shortly before, he had had the chance to shoot a prominent American officer, accompanied by another in distinctive hussar dress, but decided not to do so, as the man had his back to him and was unaware of Ferguson's presence. A surgeon told Ferguson in the hospital that some American casualties had said that General Washington had been in the area at the time. Ferguson wrote that, even if the officer were the general, he did not regret his decision. The officer's identity remains uncertain; historians suggest that the aide in hussar dress might indicate the senior officer was Count Casimir Pulaski.

For some months after being wounded, Ferguson was at risk for amputation of his arm. During this time, he received news of his father's death. Ferguson eventually recovered, although his right arm was permanently crippled.

1778
Ferguson resumed his military duties in May 1778, under the command of Sir Henry Clinton.

In October 1778, Ferguson was assigned to lead a raid in southern New Jersey to suppress privateers who had been seizing British ships. They were based around the Little Egg Harbor River, which empties into the Great Bay. Ferguson attacked their base in what is known as the Battle of Chestnut Neck.

About a week later, Ferguson was notified by a Hessian defector, Lieutenant Carl Wilhelm Juliat, who had returned to the British side after a furious argument with the American Lieutenant Colonel Carl Von Bose, that a detachment of Count Pułaski's troops, under Von Bose's command, was located nearby. Ferguson marched his troops to the site of Bose's infantry outpost, which comprised fifty men and was a short distance from Pulaski's main encampment. At first light on 15 October 1778, Ferguson ordered his men to use bayonets to attack the sleeping men of the American force. Pulaski reported that Ferguson's Tories killed, wounded or took prisoner about 30 of his men in what the Americans called the Little Egg Harbor massacre.

Ferguson's own account (under the pen-name Egg-Shell) expresses his dismay at Pułaski's lack of preparations and failure to post look-outs. He said in his official report that little quarter could be given, and his men took only five prisoners. Ferguson reported that he did not destroy the three houses which sheltered the Americans because they were the dwellings of inoffensive Quakers, who were innocent civilians. Pułaski eventually led his mounted troops (Pułaski's Legion) forward, causing Ferguson to retreat to his boats, minus a few men who had been captured. Ferguson reported his losses as two killed, three wounded, and one missing.

1779
Ferguson was commissioned as a Major in the 71st Foot on 25 October 1779.

1780
In 1780, the British Army sent General Lord Cornwallis to invade South Carolina and North Carolina. His mission was to defeat all American forces in the Carolinas and keep the two colonies within the British Empire. A key part of Cornwallis's plan was to recruit soldiers from local Loyalists. To achieve this goal, General Clinton appointed Major Ferguson as Inspector of Militia in South Carolina.  Ferguson's mission was to recruit Loyalist militia in the Carolinas and Georgia and to intimidate any colonists who favoured American independence.

Major Patrick Ferguson was appointed Inspector of Militia Corps on 22 May 1780. His task was to march to the old Tryon County area, raise and organize Loyalist units from the Tory population of the Carolina Backcountry, and protect the left flank of  Cornwallis' main body at Charlotte, North Carolina. By this time, Ferguson had acquired the nickname of "Bulldog" among his militiamen.

After winning several victories over American forces, Cornwallis occupied Charlotte,  in the summer of 1780. He divided his army and gave command of one section to Ferguson. Ferguson's wing consisted of Loyalists he had recruited to fight for the British cause.

Battle of Musgrove's Mill
On the evening of 18 August 1780 two hundred mounted Patriot partisans under joint command of Colonels Isaac Shelby, James Williams, and Elijah Clarke prepared to raid a Loyalist camp at Musgrove's Mill, which controlled the local grain supply and guarded a ford of the Enoree River.   The Battle of Musgrove Mill, 19 August 1780 occurred near a ford of the Enoree River, near the present-day border between Spartanburg, Laurens and Union Counties in South Carolina. The Patriots anticipated surprising a garrison of about an equal number of Loyalists, but a local farmer informed them that the Tories had recently been reinforced by about a hundred Loyalist militia and two hundred provincial regulars on their way to join British Major Patrick Ferguson. The whole battle took perhaps an hour and within that period, sixty-three Tories were killed, an unknown number wounded, and seventy were taken prisoner. The Patriots lost only about four dead and twelve wounded.

Some Whig leaders briefly considered attacking the Tory stronghold at Ninety Six, South Carolina; but they hurriedly dispersed after learning that a large Patriot army had been defeated at Camden three days previous.

Pursuit of Shelby
Shelby's forces covered sixty miles with Ferguson in hot pursuit before making good their escape. In the wake of General Horatio Gates’ blundering defeat at Camden, the victory at Musgrove Mill heartened the Patriots and served as further evidence that the South Carolina backcountry could not be held by the Tories.

Shelby and his Overmountain Men crossed back over the Appalachian Mountains and fled back into the territory of the Watauga Association at Sycamore Shoals in present day Elizabethton, Tennessee, and by the next month on 25 September 1780, Colonels Shelby, John Sevier, and Charles McDowell and their 600 Overmountain Men had combined forces with Col. William Campbell and his 400 Virginia men at the Sycamore Shoals muster in advance of the 7 October 1780 Battle of Kings Mountain near present day Blacksburg, South Carolina.

On 2 September, Ferguson and the militia he had already recruited marched west in pursuit of Shelby toward the Appalachian Mountain hill country on what is now the Tennessee/North Carolina border. By 10 September, Ferguson had established a base camp at Gilbert Town, North Carolina and issued a challenge to the Patriot leaders to lay down their arms or he would "lay waste to their country with fire and sword."

North Carolina Patriot militia leaders Isaac Shelby and John Sevier, from the Washington District (now northeast Tennessee), met and agreed to lead their militiamen against him.

Battle of Kings Mountain

When Major Ferguson reportedly threatened to invade the mountains beyond the legal limit on westward settlement unless the colonists there abandoned the cause of American independence (Ferguson was actually in pursuit of Issac Shelby following the Battle of Musgrove's Mill), the Overmountain Men first mustered at Sycamore Shoals organised a militia to eventually fight Ferguson and his British Loyalists at King's Pinnacle, an isolated ridge on the border between the Carolinas.

On 7 October 1780, the two armies clashed during the Battle of Kings Mountain. The battle went badly for the Loyalists positioned high on the mountain ridge, and during the fighting, Ferguson was shot from his horse. With his foot still in the stirrup, he was dragged to the patriot side. According to patriot accounts, when a Patriot approached the major for his surrender, Ferguson drew his pistol and shot him as a last act of defiance. Other soldiers retaliated, and Ferguson's body was found with eight musket holes in it. Patriot accounts said their militia stripped his body of clothing and urinated on him before burial. They buried him in an oxhide near the site of his fall. Col. Benjamin Cleveland of North Carolina claimed Ferguson's white stallion as a "war prize” and rode it home to his estate of Roundabout.

One of Ferguson's mistresses, "Virginia Sal", was also killed in the battle and was buried with the officer. In the 1920s, the U.S. government erected a marker at Ferguson's gravesite, which today is a part of the Kings Mountain National Military Park, administered by the National Park Service.

Ferguson's personal correspondence reveals a man of intelligence, humour and charm. He also wrote several articles, satirical in tone, for publication in Rivington's Royal Gazette, under the pseudonyms Egg-Shell, Memento Mori and John Bull.

He was survived by his mother, his brothers James and George, and sisters Annie, Elizabeth (Betty) (Mrs Scrymgeour-Wedderburn of Birkhill), and Jean.

Popular culture
In the novel Horse-Shoe Robinson (1835) by John Pendleton Kennedy, an historical romance set against the background of the Southern campaigns in the American War of Independence, fictional characters interact with Ferguson as he is en route to the climactic scene in which he is killed in the Battle of Kings Mountain.

In Louis L'Amour's book The Ferguson Rifle (1973), Ferguson stops by a poor family home on his way to the Battle of King's Mountain and kindly gives his personal copy of the Ferguson rifle to a boy who later carries it West. Ferguson is shown to be a gentleman who displays all the appropriate social graces to a lady (the boy's ill mother) and compassion to a family in need by giving up his personal firearm, asking only that the boy keep it always, and never use it against the king. (p7)

In Steve Ressel's novel State of One (2010), Ferguson is the main antagonist featured against James Pariah, a soldier formerly under Ferguson's command during the Battle of the Brandywine in 1777.  Ferguson had been resurrected as a golem by the Leeds Witch with hopes of raising a golem army of similar soldiers, all armed with Ferguson rifles, to destroy the ratification of the US Constitution in September 1787.  James Pariah cleaves to his old Ferguson rifle, sometimes referring to it as his wife, having modified it with special actions such as a spring-loaded knife in the stock.

In Sharyn McCrumb's novel Kings Mountain: A Ballad Novel (2014), Ferguson is the central antagonist.  Events leading to and the battle itself are covered from multiple viewpoints on both sides.

In the 2014 episode "Patriots Rising" of the television program The American Revolution, Ferguson is portrayed as having George Washington in his gunsight, but choosing not to shoot.

In the outdoor drama Horn in the West, Ferguson is portrayed harassing Daniel Boone's Patriot friends ultimately leading to the Battle of Kings Mountain whereby his final defiant moments are carried out by shooting a Patriot with his pistol.

Notes

References
 
 Draper, Lyman C., Anthony Allaire, Isaac Shelby. King's Mountain and Its Heroes: History of the Battle of King's Mountain. Cincinnati: Peter G. Thompson, Publisher, 1881. 
 Dykeman, Wilma. With Fire and Sword: The Battle of Kings Mountain 1780. Washington, D.C., National Park Service, U.S. Govt. Print. Off., 1978. .
 Gilchrist, M M. Patrick Ferguson: "A Man of Some Genius", 2003, .
 Irving, Washington. Life of Washington. Volume 3. New York : G.P. Putnam, 1860. .
 Kajencki, AnnMarie Francis. Count Casimir Pulaski: From Poland to America, a Hero's Fight for Liberty. New York : PowerPlus Books, 2005. .
 
 Sears, Robert. The shot heard round the world: from Lexington to Yorktown: a pictorial history of the American Revolution. Boston: John Adams Lee Pub., 1889. .

External links 

on-line article by his biographer M M Gilchrist
on-line article in The Gaston Gazette highlighting Martin CJ Mongiello's work with the American Revolutionary War Living History Center to rededicate the Major Patrick Ferguson North Carolina Historical Marker in Grover, NC
Every Insult and Indignity: The Life, Genius and Legacy of Major Patrick Ferguson

1744 births
1780 deaths
Military personnel from Edinburgh
Royal Scots Greys officers
East Surrey Regiment officers
Highland Light Infantry officers
British Army personnel of the American Revolutionary War
Scottish inventors
British military personnel killed in the American Revolutionary War
Scottish military personnel killed in action
British Army personnel of the Seven Years' War
18th-century Scottish people
Gunsmiths
People of the Scottish Enlightenment